The 1986 BC Lions finished in second place in the West Division with a 12–6 record. They appeared in the West Final.

Offseason

CFL Draft

Preseason

Regular season

Season standings

Season schedule

Awards and records
 CFL's Most Outstanding Defensive Player Award – James "Quick" Parker (DE)
 CFLPA's Most Outstanding Community Service Award – Tyrone Crews (LB)

1986 CFL All-Stars
 DE – James "Quick" Parker, CFL All-Star
 DB – Larry Crawford, CFL All-Star

Playoffs

West Semi-Final

West Final

References

BC Lions seasons
1986 Canadian Football League season by team
1986 in British Columbia